Esteban Torres High School is a public high school, it opened in 2010 in East Los Angeles, an unincorporated section of Los Angeles County, California.

History
The school was originally known as East Los Angeles Area High School #2. In 2006 the school was named Esteban E. Torres High School, after retired U.S. Representative Esteban Edward Torres. The school opened on September 13, 2010 with students in grades 9–12.

Campus
The school is sited on 12.15 acres which was formerly occupied by Hammel Street Elementary School and commercial and housing developments.  The buildings were designed by Langdon Wilson Architects.

Curriculum
The school is composed of five smaller schools:

Sports
Soccer, cross country, basketball, wrestling and volleyball are offered for both boys and girls.  Additional sports for boys include baseball and football, and for girls they have a softball team.

Noted Person
Actress Candy Moore taught English at the East Los Angeles Performing Arts Academy Magnet at the school till 2019.

References

External links

East L.A. High School #2
East LA Renaissance Academy

Los Angeles Unified School District schools
Educational institutions established in 2010
High schools in Los Angeles County, California
Public high schools in California
2010 establishments in California